was a Japanese football player. He played for Japan national team. His brother Takeshi Kamo also played for Japan national team.

Club career
Kamo was born in Hamamatsu on December 12, 1915. He played for Waseda University. He won the 1938 Emperor's Cup with Sei Fuwa, Sekiji Sasano, Kunitaka Sueoka, Hidetoki Takahashi, and the rest of the team. After graduating from university, he played for Waseda WMW, which consisted of players who were fellow Waseda University alumni.

National team career

In 1936, when Kamo was a Waseda University student, he was selected for the Japan national team for the 1936 Summer Olympics in Berlin. At this competition, he debuted against Sweden on August 4. He assisted Taizo Kawamoto and Tokutaro Ukon with goals, and Japan completed a come-from-behind victory. The first victory in the Olympics for Japan and a historic victory over one of the powerhouses later became known as the "Miracle of Berlin" (ベルリンの奇跡) in Japan. In 2016, this team was selected for the Japan Football Hall of Fame. On August 7, he also played against Italy. He played two games for Japan in 1936. His older brother Takeshi Kamo was also an Olympic footballer for Japan.

On September 14, 1977, Kamo collapsed during training for an exhibition match at the National Stadium in Shinjuku, Tokyo. He died of a myocardial infarction at a hospital at the age of 61.

National team statistics

References

External links

 
 Japan National Football Team Database
Japan Football Hall of Fame (Japan team at 1936 Olympics) at Japan Football Association

1915 births
1977 deaths
Waseda University alumni
Association football people from Shizuoka Prefecture
Japanese footballers
Japan international footballers
Olympic footballers of Japan
Footballers at the 1936 Summer Olympics
Association football forwards